The 2021–22 season was Benevento's first season back in Serie B following its relegation from the top-flight of Italian football in the previous season. It was the club's fourth season in Serie B in its history. In addition to the domestic league, Benevento participated in this season's edition of the Coppa Italia.

Players

First-team squad

Pre-season and friendlies

Competitions

Overall record

Serie B

League table

Matches
The league fixtures were announced on 14 July 2021.

Coppa Italia

References

Benevento Calcio seasons
Benevento Calcio